Paseo San Pedro is a small, high-fashion shopping mall in Monterrey, Mexico, located in San Pedro Garza García, in the intersection of Avenida Gómez Morín, Avenida José Vasconcelos, and Calzada del Valle, in front of Los Tubos. The mall takes its name from the municipality it resides in.

Notable Attractions
 Numerous full service restaurants, banks, and high fashion clothing stores.
 An El Palacio de Hierro department store.
 A NH Hoteles hotel
 A Cinemex movie theater
 A Food Court

Shopping malls in Monterrey
Shopping malls established in 2005